Jasper Heusinkveld (born 24 December 1988) is a Dutch professional footballer who last played as a goalkeeper for De Graafschap in the Dutch Eredivisie. He currently plays in the Hoofdklasse for SV DFS.

References

External links
 Voetbal International profile 

1988 births
Living people
People from Doetinchem
Footballers from Gelderland
Dutch footballers
Association football goalkeepers
Go Ahead Eagles players
De Graafschap players
Eerste Divisie players